Rhodinia is a genus of moths in the family Saturniidae first described by Otto Staudinger in 1892.

Species
Rhodinia broschi Brechlin, 2001
Rhodinia davidi (Oberthuer, 1886)
Rhodinia fugax (Butler, 1877)
Rhodinia grigauti Le Moult, 1933
Rhodinia jankowskii (Oberthuer, 1880)
Rhodinia newara (Moore, 1872)
Rhodinia rudloffi Brechlin, 2001
Rhodinia silkae Brechlin & van Schayck, 2010
Rhodinia szechuanensis Mell, 1938
Rhodinia tenzingyatsoi Naumann, 2001
Rhodinia verecunda Inoue, 1984

References

Saturniidae